Emanuel Plattner (born 29 May 1935) is a Swiss racing cyclist. He rode in the 1959 Tour de France.

References

1935 births
Living people
Swiss male cyclists
Place of birth missing (living people)